Henry Seiling (born May, 1872, date of death unknown) was an American tug of war athlete who competed in the 1904 Summer Olympics. He was born in Wisconsin. In the 1904 Olympics he won a gold medal as a member of the Milwaukee Athletic Club team.

References

External links
profile

1872 births
Year of death missing
Olympic tug of war competitors of the United States
Tug of war competitors at the 1904 Summer Olympics
Olympic gold medalists for the United States in tug of war
Medalists at the 1904 Summer Olympics